Crawford Corners may refer to:

Crawford Corners, New Jersey
Crawford Corners, Ohio